The 1980–81 season was the 66th season of the Isthmian League, an English football competition.

Slough Town were champions, winning their first Isthmian League title. Though, there was no promotion from the Isthmian League to the Alliance Premier League till 1985, at the end of the season two Premier Division clubs - Dagenham and Enfield were accepted to the APL. Billericay Town finished second in Division One achieving the second promotion in a row. Willesden folded at the end of the season.

Premier Division

The Premier Division consisted of 22 clubs, including 20 clubs from the previous season and two new clubs, promoted from Division One:
Bromley
Leytonstone & Ilford

There was no relegation from the division this season after Dagenham and Enfield joined the Alliance Premier League.

League table

Division One

Division One consisted of 22 clubs, including 18 clubs from the previous season and four new clubs:

Two clubs relegated from the Premier Division:
Oxford City
Tilbury

Two clubs promoted from Division Two:
Billericay Town
Lewes

League table

Division Two

Second Division consisted of 20 clubs, including 17 clubs from the previous season and three new teams:
Dorking Town, joined from the Athenian League
Harwich & Parkeston, relegated from Division One
Horsham, relegated from Division One

League table

References

Isthmian League seasons
I